The University of Al-Qadisiyah is an Iraqi university established in 1987 in Al Diwaniyah, Qadisiyyah Province, Iraq.

History

The University of Al-Qadisiyah was established on the 23rd of December, 1987 through a resolution (no. 159) passed by the Revolutionary Command Council of the Saddam era. The resolution ordered the establishment of four universities; the University of Al-Qadisiyah, the University of Kufa, the University of Tikrit, and the University of Anbar. Originally, the University of Al-Qadisiyah began with two colleges; the College of Education and the College of Business and Administration. There has been a vast increase in this number though, as today, the university encompasses 18 colleges in addition to a number of learning centers.

Colleges

 College of Education
 College of Business and Administration
 College of Arts
 College of Veterinary Medicine
 College of Medicine 
 College of Physical Education
 College of Science
 College of Law
 College of Engineering
 College of Computer Science and Mathematics
 College of Agriculture
 College of Pharmacy 
 College of Nursing
 College of Dentistry
 College of Education - Femmés
 College of Archaeology
 College of Fine Arts
 College of Biotechnology

Campuses

Al-Qadisiyah is located between a strict conservative society to the west (the holy cities of Najaf and Karbala), and the more liberal alternative to the north (Hilla, and Baghdad). The result is a mix between conservative and liberal styling in campus planning and student life. The main campus is located on the north-western edge of the city of Diwaniya. The majority of the university's colleges along with the main administrative building are found here.

In addition to the main campus, there are smaller campuses sprawled in and around the city of Diwaniya:
 Medicine & Nursing Campus @ Diwaniya Teaching Hospital
 Law Campus across from the Provincial Government Building
 Engineering campus located across from the main train station
 Education campus located near the College of Engineering
 Veterinary campus located on the northern edge of the city for better access to farms

References

External links
Official website 
Official website 

Qadisiyah
Educational institutions established in 1987
1987 establishments in Iraq